Karen Rosted Holmgaard (born 28 January 1999) is a Danish professional football player who plays as a midfielder for Everton in England's top-division FA Women's Super League and for the Danish national team. She is the twin sister of Everton teammate Sara Holmgaard.

International career
Karen Holmgaard previously played for Vejle BK, from 2016 to 2017, until the switch to Fortuna Hjørring. Since her debut for Fortuna Hjørring in 2017, she had been a central and supporting player, both in the team and in the league. She quit the club in December 2020, in favor of the German big club Turbine Potsdam, together with her twin sister Sara Holmgaard.

She made her debut on the senior Danish national team on 21 January 2019, against Finland.

Holmgaard was named Female Talent of the Year in 2018 by the Danish Football Union.

International goals

References

External links
 

1999 births
Living people
Danish women's footballers
Denmark women's international footballers
Fortuna Hjørring players
Women's association football midfielders
Danish twins
Twin sportspeople
1. FFC Turbine Potsdam players
UEFA Women's Euro 2022 players
Expatriate sportspeople in England
Expatriate sportspeople in Germany